The Denbigh Flint complex was a Paleo-Inuit material culture that was active in Alaska and northwestern Canada from 4,000 to 3300 years ago (1450 to 2450 BC). They were the first members of the wide material assemblage known as the Arctic Small Tool tradition. Sites attributed to the Denbigh Flint complex mostly inhabited northern Alaska from Cape Krusenstern to the western Yukon, but sites are also found further to the south from the Aleutian islands into mainland Alaska. They were mobile hunter-gatherers who relied on caribou herds for sustenance. The Denbigh Flint complex likely were descendants from the Syalakh and Bel’kachi cultures of Siberia. They engaged in wide-scale trade, moving pieces of obsidian over 500km. The economy of the Denbigh Flint complex was based around both maritime and terrestrial resources. They made seasonal visits to the coast to hunt seals, but their primary food was caribou, which they hunted year-round. Denbigh peoples also fished, picked berries, and hunted birds in the fall.

Archaeological sites 
As of 2016, there are 140 archaeological sites that were inhabited by members of the Denbigh Flint Complex. One of the major sites is the Iyatayet site, which was where the Denbigh Flint complex was discovered. Denbigh peoples spent wintertime on the shores of lakes in the tundra or in forested areas, where they inhabited semi-subterranean houses. In other seasons, they occupied both interior and coastal locations in tents placed around a stone hearth.

Tools 

These sites are classified as belonging to the Denbigh Flint complex because they share similar tool technologies. Stone tools were highly specialized and were finely sharpened. This is evidenced by the tool chip byproducts found at sites and the large number of different types of blades. The archaeologist Andrew H. Tremayne states that:

References

Further reading
 

Archaeology of Canada
Archaeological cultures of North America
Prehistory of the Arctic
Inupiat culture
Peopling of the Americas